Ecological dominance is the degree to which one or several species have a major influence controlling the other species in their ecological community (because of their large size, population, productivity, or related factors) or make up more of the biomass.  

Most ecological communities are defined by their dominant species.

In many examples of wet woodland in western Europe, the dominant tree is alder (Alnus glutinosa).
In temperate bogs, the dominant vegetation is usually species of Sphagnum moss.
Tidal swamps in the tropics are usually dominated by species of mangrove (Rhizophoraceae)
Some sea floor communities are dominated by brittle stars.
Exposed rocky shorelines are dominated by sessile organisms such as barnacles and limpets.

See also
National Vegetation Classification, a system for classifying British plant communities by their dominant species
 Monodominance

References

External links 
Dominant Species in a Diverse Ecosystem

Habitats